TSS Slieve Bloom was a twin screw steamer cargo vessel operated by the London and North Western Railway from 1908 to 1918.

History

She was completed by Vickers, Sons & Maxim Ltd of Barrow-in-Furness for the London and North Western Railway in 1908. She was named after the Slieve Bloom Mountains in Ireland. She was very similar in specification to her sister ship, Slieve Gallion.

The passengers evacuated to lifeboats and were later picked up by a sister ship and taken to Liverpool. There was one life lost, of a passenger whose cabin was close to the point of impact. The destroyer put into Liverpool for repairs to her bow.

References

1908 ships
Passenger ships of the United Kingdom
Steamships
Ships built in Barrow-in-Furness
Ships of the London and North Western Railway
Maritime incidents in 1918
Ships sunk in collisions
World War I shipwrecks in the Irish Sea